James Lane may refer to:

 James Henry Lane (Union general) (1814–1866), Kansas senator and U.S. Army general
 James Henry Lane (Confederate general) (1833–1907), university professor and Confederate general in the American Civil War
 James Tyson Lane (1835–1885), Louisiana state legislator
 Jim Lane (Irish republican) (born 1938), Irish republican and socialist
 James T. Lane (born 1977), actor and dancer
 Jim Lane (mayor) (born 1951), mayor of Scottsdale, Arizona
 Jimmy D. Lane (born 1965), American electric blues guitarist

See also
 James Laine, author of Shivaji: Hindu King in Islamic India